Parker B. Chase (born February 22, 2001) is an American professional racing driver who competes full-time in the International Motor Sports Association (IMSA) Michelin Pilot Challenge and driving the No. 98 Hyundai Veloster N TCR for Bryan Herta Autosport and part-time in the NASCAR Xfinity Series driving the No. 24 Toyota Supra for Sam Hunt Racing. He has experience in sports car and stock car racing, including racing in the IMSA WeatherTech SportsCar Championship, NASCAR Camping World Truck Series, and ARCA Menards Series

Racing career
In 2011, Chase begun his racing career driving go-karts at age 10 in his hometown of New Braunfels, Texas. The next year, Chase would enter the 2012 Florida Winter Tour, finishing 38th in the event.

In 2013, Chase entered the Rotax Max Challenge Grand finals where he would finish in 25th. In 2014, Chase entered the SKUSA SuperNationals XVIII, where he would finish in 45th.

In 2015, Chase would stray away from Go-Karts, driving a Mazda MX-5 Miata in the NASA Eastern States Championships for one race, finishing 12th. Chase would then join Chastain Motorsports in the F1600 Formula F Championship Series for 10 races. At Road Atlanta, he finished 11th twice in a row before finishing 8th. A month later at Watkins Glen, Chase would finish 15th, 17th, and then 16th. Another month later, Formula F raced three times at Virginia International Raceway, where he would finish 13th, 18th, and 11th. Chase also attempted another Florida Winter Tour, this time finishing 39th.

In 2016, Chase would join Performance Motorsports Group in the Pirelli World Challenge for the whole season. The season started well for Chase finishing on the podium at the Circuit of the Americas, before finishing 5th on the same track a day later. Throughout the season, Chase would rack up 6 podiums, three of them being second-place finishes. He would finish 4th in the overall standings. He also raced in the Global RallyCross Championship Lites division for PMG until the team sold his car to DirtFish Motorsports.

Chase would return to the Performance Motorsports Group for 10 races in 2017, getting a podium in 4 races, getting 2nd place in both races at the Circuit of the Americas. Later that year, Chase joined Century Motorsport in the British GT Championship for two races. He would also make his debut in the WeatherTech SportsCar Championship at Circuit of the Americas, driving a Porsche for The Motorsports Group alongside driver Harry Gottsacker. The pair would finish 29th, a lap behind the leaders. In 2018, Chase would join TruSpeed AutoSport in two different Pirelli World Challenge series, winning 6 races between the two and coming home with a championship.

The next year Chase would enter the Pirelli GT4 American East this time with RENNtech Motorsports, where he raced only two races at Circuit of the Americas, where he finished 2nd both times. He also entered the WeatherTech SportsCar Championship driving for Starworks Motorsport in 6 races and AIM Vasser Sullivan for 1 race. During the season, Chase would enter his first 24 Hours at Daytona event, teaming up with drivers Ryan Dalziel, Ezequiel Perez Companc, and Christopher Haase towards a 13th-place finish in their class. At Sebring, Chase, Companc, and Dalziel would team up again, finishing the race 34th overall. In the next 5 races that Chase participated in, he would team up with Dalziel. However, at Watkins Glen Mike Skeen joined the duo for a single race, helping them towards a finish of 29th overall. At Road Atlanta, Chase joined AIM Vasser Sullivan for a single race, teaming up with drivers Jack Hawksworth and Richard Heistand towards an overall finish of 28th.

Chase would stay with AIM Vasser Sullivan in 2020, racing in the 24 Hours of Daytona alongside Hawksworth, Michael de Quesada, and Kyle Busch. They would finish 9th in their class and 26th overall. In June, he signed with Bryan Herta Autosport for the Michelin Pilot Challenge season, driving the No. 29 Hyundai Veloster N TCR alongside Spencer Brockman. Chase began competing in stock cars in August when he ran the ARCA Menards Series race on the Daytona road course for Chad Bryant Racing and in late models in North Carolina.

In 2021, Chase moved to Herta's No. 98, sharing the car with MPC TCR champion Ryan Norman. He also joined Kyle Busch Motorsports for a two-race NASCAR Camping World Truck Series schedule on Daytona's road course and at Circuit of the Americas.

Motorsports career results

NASCAR
(key) (Bold – Pole position awarded by qualifying time. Italics – Pole position earned by points standings or practice time. * – Most laps led.)

Xfinity Series

Camping World Truck Series

 Season in progress 
 Ineligible for series points

ARCA Menards Series
(key) (Bold – Pole position awarded by qualifying time. Italics – Pole position earned by points standings or practice time. * – Most laps led.)

ARCA Menards Series East

ARCA Menards Series West

Complete IMSA SportsCar Championship results
(key) (Races in bold indicate pole position) (Races in italics indicate fastest lap)

24 Hours of Daytona

References

External links
 
 

Living people
Racing drivers from Texas
Sportspeople from New Braunfels, Texas
24 Hours of Daytona drivers
2001 births
NASCAR drivers
ARCA Menards Series drivers
Bryan Herta Autosport drivers
Kyle Busch Motorsports drivers
Starworks Motorsport drivers
WeatherTech SportsCar Championship drivers
Michelin Pilot Challenge drivers